The Soi Dog Foundation is a nonprofit organisation for the welfare of stray dogs and cats. Its headquarters is in Phuket, Thailand, and it has been legally registered in Thailand, the United States, Canada, Australia, France, United Kingdom, Switzerland, and The Netherlands. Its primary goal is to care for homeless and abused dogs in Thailand. It was established by British couple John and Gill Dalley with the help of Margot Homburg Park in Phuket in 2003. 

The foundation has saved thousands of dogs from illegal trades, particularly for meat, and tries to reduce free-ranging dog populations through sterilisation. Soi is a Thai word for "street", a reference to the fact that smaller streets in Thailand often teem with stray dogs. The sterilisation programme has been extended to stray cats. It gets support from international celebrities including Dame Judi Dench, Laura Carmichael, and Ricky Gervais. The foundation's 2014 campaign led to the enactment of the Prevention of Animal Cruelty and Provision of Animal Welfare Act, the first animal welfare act in Thailand.

Background and origin
Thailand, and other countries in Southeast Asia, are known for their stray dogs and, until 2014, the dog meat trade. Whilst the trade became illegal in Thailand, in other countries in the region such as Vietnam and Cambodia, there are dog butchers, dog tanneries, and holding centres for captive canines. Many dogs were exported to Vietnam and China for dog meat. The dog trade involves smuggling by organised gangs. Thailand's largest island, Phuket, is the major centre of such activities, and is the home of many stray dogs. The Thai Veterinary Medical Association reported that in 2011, half a million dogs were traded to Vietnam and China. 

These dogs are trapped and collected to be sold in the market or passed on to traders for export. The animals often suffer during transport due to congested packing in crates, and many of them suffocate and die in the process. Seeing this appalling situation, American-born Margot Homburg Park decided to join hands with a British couple, John and Gill Dalley, to try to end the suffering of dogs in Thailand. John Dalley is a retired chemical engineer from Leeds, England, and Gill a former bank employee. Gill Dalley died after a short illness on 13 February 2017.
 The couple had moved to Phuket for a retired life. John Dalley remarked, "We had a dog back home [in Leeds], but I wasn't particularly involved with animal rights. But you see these dogs [in Thailand] suffer, and you want to do something to help them." 

In 2003 they established the foundation by opening a clinic and recruiting veterinarians on a volunteer basis to take care of homeless dogs. For their name, they chose the Thai word soi, which means "street", hence, the organisation literally means "street dog foundation". They began by neutering and vaccinating stray dogs. In 2004, following the catastrophic Indian Ocean tsunami which devastated both human and animal populations in the region, Soi Dog's presence became even more valuable. In 2005, the foundation was officially registered, becoming the first animal welfare organisation in Thailand. In 2011, a permanent clinic was opened in Bangkok, the nation's capital. The foundation's mission is 'To improve the welfare of dogs and cats in Asia, resulting in better lives for both the animal and human communities, to create a society without homeless animals, and to ultimately end animal cruelty'. As a result of its vaccination effort, Phuket has seen only one confirmed case of rabies since 1995.

Activity
Following the outlawing of the dog meat trade in Thailand in 2014, the foundation has focused its efforts on spaying and neutering as many dogs as possible. Spay/neuter is widely recognised as the most humane, effective, and sustainable method of controlling the stray population. Soi Dog neuters over 100,000 stray dogs every year to reduce the population living on the streets. It keeps around 1,100 homeless dogs and cats under care. In Phuket, due to the reduction in the stray dog population (over 90% since 2003) the Soi Dog Foundation has actually neutered more cats than dogs on the island since 2015.

Support
British celebrities Judi Dench, Laura Carmichael, Peter Egan, Penelope Wilton and Ricky Gervais launched a public campaign to support the causes of the foundation in 2014.

The campaign was a success in terms of political action. The National Assembly of Thailand passed its first Animal Welfare Bill on 13 December 2014. On 27 December, the government enacted the Prevention of Animal Cruelty and Provision of Animal Welfare Act, which was the first animal welfare act in Thailand.

Ambassadors
Apart from the officials in the foundation, honorary ambassadors include Naomi Bromley, a British Vegan campaigner; Dena Kaplan, an Australian actress, singer, and dancer; Natalie Glebova, a Russian-Canadian model, writer, and holder of the Miss Universe 2005 title; and Kyle Leask, an autistic boy, and his dog Miracle, winner of the Eukanuba Friends For Life award.

See also

 Street dogs in Thailand
 Animal welfare in Thailand

References

External links
 

Animal welfare organizations based in Thailand
Dog organizations
Non-profit organizations based in Thailand